T. K. Rangarajan (born 30 September 1941) is an Indian communist politician and trade unionist. He is a Central Committee member of the Communist Party of India (Marxist), Tamil Nadu State Executive Committee member of CPI(M), All India Vice-president of the Centre of Indian Trade Unions.

He is a member of Rajya sabha from Tamil Nadu for two terms. He is the Leader of the Parliamentary group of CPI(M) in Rajya Sabha, since the retirement of  Sitaram Yechury, the General Secretary of the party, from the Rajya Sabha.

References

[Personal Details From]

Communist Party of India (Marxist) politicians from Tamil Nadu
Trade unionists from Tamil Nadu
Living people
1941 births
Rajya Sabha members from Tamil Nadu
Politicians from Madurai
20th-century Indian politicians
Tamil Nadu politicians